Mahaguru (Bengali: মহাগুরু) is a 2007 Indian Bengali-language film directed by Anup Sengupta, starring Mithun Chakraborty, Debashree Roy, Jisshu Sengupta, George Baker and Anu Choudhury.

Cast

 Mithun Chakraborty as Inspector Rudra Sen/Guru (Dual role) 
 Debashree Roy as Indrani Sen, Rudra's wife
 Jisshu Sengupta as Bishu, Shiv Kumar Naskar
 Anu Choudhury as Manoshi Sen, Rudra's sister
 Piya Sengupta as Guru's love interest
 George Baker as Pandit Ajay Sinha, Arms and RDX smuggler
 Shyamal Dutta as Central Minister
 Joy Badlani as Inspector Bijay Sarkar
 Dulal Lahiri as DIG Somnath Sen, Rudra's father
 Subhasish Mukhopadhyay as Khabrilal, an Informer
 Ramen Roy Chowdhury as Police Commissioner
 Shankar Chakraborty as Munna, Panditji's henchman
 Anamika Saha as Guru's mother
 Anuradha Ray as Mita Roy, Amit Roy's wife.

Music 
The album is composed by Ashok Bhadra, while lyrics are penned by Goutam Susmit.

Box office

The film had a seven-week run in Calcutta, and earned a profit of over rupees 25 lakhs against a budget of rupees 1 crore.

References

External links
  http://www.bengalitollywood.com/movies/Bengali-Tollywood/Mahaguru-2007
  https://archive.today/20130217230550/http://www.gomolo.in/Movie/MovieCastcrew.aspx?mid=15451

2007 films
2000s Bengali-language films
Bengali-language Indian films
Films directed by Anup Sengupta